The Lauritz Smith House is a historic house in Draper, Utah, United States, that is listed on the National Register of Historic Places (NRHP).

Description
The house is located at 1350 Eest 12400 South and was built .

It is "architecturally important because it represents a rare example of the New England 'Saltbox' house in Utah."  Saltbox architecture is relatively common in the U.S. northeast where Mormonism began, but is rare in Utah.  The only other known examples at the time of NRHP nomination were the Joseph Beesley House in Provo (which has been significantly modified), the William Skeen House (NRHP-listed) in Plain City, and Hampton's Ford Stage Station (NRHP-listed) in Bear River.

According to the NRHP nomination:
The true saltbox house in New England is characterized by a massive central chimney as well as the shed-like outshut extending out to the rear from the two-story front section. As the type moved into the Midwest and then to Utah it gradually lost the central fireplace in favor of a central-hall and two gable-end chimneys. 2 The Lauritz Smith house in Draper, Utah, built in c.1865, is an example of this 'modified' Saltbox type."

The house was listed on the NRHP June 24, 1983.

See also

 National Register of Historic Places listings in Salt Lake County, Utah
 Lauritz H. and Emma Smith House, Draper, also NRHP-listed in Draper.

References

External links

Houses on the National Register of Historic Places in Utah
Saltbox architecture in Utah
Houses completed in 1865
Houses in Salt Lake County, Utah
National Register of Historic Places in Salt Lake County, Utah
Buildings and structures in Draper, Utah